The 1895 New Jersey Athletic Club football team was an American football team that represented the New Jersey Athletic Club as an independent during the 1895 football season.  The team shut out four of its opponents, compiled a 5–3 record, and outscored their opponents by a total of 131 to 72.

Schedule

References

New Jersey Athletic Club
Athletic Club football teams and seasons
New Jersey Athletic Club football